Dominique Richardson (born 6 September 1992), is a Bermudian footballer who plays as a midfielder.

College
In 2010, Richardson enrolled at the Barry University to play for their Division II NAIA program. In her first year she redshirted, not participating in a team a year later. She played her first match in 24 August 2012, against Webber.

Personal life
She joined Insurance group Ace's professional lines department on a two-year graduate training programme in August 2015.

See also
List of Bermuda women's international footballers

References

External links 
 
 Barry University profile

1992 births
Living people
Women's association football midfielders
Bermudian women's footballers
Bermuda women's international footballers
Barry Buccaneers women's soccer players